Lau Teng Chuan BPE, MSc (13 April 1929 – 8 May 2012) was a Singaporean sportsman, coach, teacher, and sports administrator, and considered to be the 'father of physical education' in Singapore.  Lau was instrumental in the development of sports in Singapore.

Education
He attended Victoria School in Singapore, where he had excelled in sports, and he graduated from Loughborough College in the United Kingdom, where he studied physical education to become a Physical Education teacher, graduating with a DLC 1st Class Honours in 1956. In 1973, he obtained a Master of Science from the University of Oregon in United States.

Appointments
After graduating from Loughborough College, he became a lecturer and eventually the chief of physical education at the then-Institute of Education, until 1975.  He served as the executive director of the Singapore Sports Council from 1975 to 1992, where he assisted the government in shaping and implementing the strategy for physical education and sports in Singapore.  He assumed the post of secretary-general of the Singapore National Olympic Council in 1995.  He left the post in 2001 at the age of 73 after a heart bypass.

He had also previously served as a vice-president of Singapore Amateur Athletics Association, and was the honorary secretary of the Football Association of Singapore from 1982, a post he held for more than a decade.

Achievements
Lau devoted his whole life to the promotion of sport in Singapore.  He believed sports was good for the nation and Singaporeans, and put his heart and soul into it, against a backdrop where economy has always been the highest priority in the country.

He was a national badminton player, represented Singapore from 1956 to 1958 and training alongside four-time All-England champion, Wong Peng Soon.  He was Singapore's chief badminton coach from 1963 to 1965, after which he served as honorary visiting coach of the New Zealand national badminton team.  He was also an avid football player, squash player, and golfer.

As one of Singapore's top sports administrator, he played a key role in implementing the physical education strategy in Singapore schools.  He championed sports-for-all initiatives and was behind pushing for sports facilities to be built in the heartlands, fitness apparatus to be built in parks, stadiums and educational institutions, as well as mass sports participation events.

He also championed an initiative to enhance coaching education and development in Singapore, which saw physical fitness instructors certified at the national level.  The National Physical Fitness Award/Assessment (NAPFA) test was introduced during his tenure at Singapore Sports Council; the test was later adapted by the Singapore Armed Forces as the Individual Physical Proficiency Test (IPPT).

A highly respected educationist and a man of many talents, his life has been about volunteerism.  Training young sports leaders in the early days has had a ripple effect on the present day.

Dr Chris Chan, Singapore National Olympic Council's secretary-general said: "Every Singaporean has benefited in some way from Lau's work, whether they know it or not."

Former Singapore Sports Council chairman, Dr Tan Eng Liang said: "His contribution as a teacher, sportsman and administrator is second to none" and that it will be hard to find another person who exhibit such selflessness and dedication to local sport.

Awards
Lau was awarded the National Day Public Service Administration awards in 1969 (bronze) for education and 1981 (silver) for sports, and the International Badminton Federation's Distinguished Service Award in 1997.  He received the Honorary Doctorate (Honoris Causa) from Loughborough University in 2003 for his contribution to the public service and the development of sports in Singapore.

Autobiography
Lau launched his autobiography less than 2 weeks before he died.  One of the 20 invited guests presented with the book at the launch was the Deputy Prime Minister of Singapore, Mr Teo Chee Hean.  The book, titled "Lau Teng Chuan (Sportsman, Teacher, Sports Administrator)", has more than 400 copies printed and distributed to various sections of the sporting fraternity.  Proceeds of the book go to the Lau Teng Chuan Scholarship Fund, which will benefit physical education teachers.

His grandchildren had urged him to pen the book to share with Singaporeans his sporting experiences and service to sports in various capacities.

Death
Lau died on 8 May 2012 at the age of 83 from stomach cancer, leaving behind his wife, Mary, 2 sons, a daughter, and 7 grandchildren.

References

 "Dr Lau Teng Chuan"
 (Summer 2003) "Degree Speeches – Lau Teng Chuan"
 (13 May 2012) Obituary – "Dr Lau Teng Chuan"
 (12 July 1948). "Lau Brothers Too Good". The Straits Times (Singapore).
 (2 July 1975). "Lau gets top post in Sports Council". The Straits Times (Singapore).
 Jose Raymond (3 October 2001). "Olympic council head Lau resigns". Today (Singapore).
 Sanjay Nair (27 April 2012). "Father of PE relives passion for sports". The Straits Times (Singapore).
 Patwant Singh (8 May 2012). "Former top sports administrator Lau Teng Chuan dies". ChannelNewsAsia (Singapore).
 May Chen (9 May 2012). "Farewell to father of P.E.". The Straits Times (Singapore).
 Godfrey Robert (9 May 2012). "GOODBYE, sporting legend" The New Paper (Singapore).
 Ian De Cotta (9 May 2012). "A sporting pioneer". Today (Singapore).

Singaporean educators
Singaporean male badminton players
Singaporean people of Chinese descent
Victoria School, Singapore alumni
Alumni of Loughborough College
Singaporean referees and umpires
1929 births
2012 deaths
Deaths from stomach cancer
Deaths from cancer in Singapore
20th-century Singaporean educators